Bakayevo (Baqay) is a rural locality (a village) in Sultanmuratovsky Selsoviet, Aurgazinsky District, Bashkortostan, Russia. The population was 20 as of 2010. There is 1 street.

Geography 
Bakayevo is located 15 km northwest of Tolbazy (the district's administrative centre) by road. Chishma is the nearest rural locality.

References 

Rural localities in Aurgazinsky District